Lake Rose may refer to:

Lake Retba in Senegal
Lake Rose (Minnesota) in Hennepin County, Minnesota
Lake Rose (Pennsylvania)

See also
Rose Lake (disambiguation)